Andrea Lalli (born 20 May 1987 in Florence) is an Italian long distance runner.

Biography

He started his career with medals at the European Cross Country Championships, taking the junior individual and team titles at the 2006 edition and then winning the under-23 title in 2008. He won his first track medal at the 2009 European Athletics U23 Championships, where he was the runner-up in the 10,000 metres behind Turkey's Mert Girmalegesse, formerly of Ethiopia. Following a win at the Lotto Cross Cup Brussels in December, Lalli formed part of the bronze medal winning Italian men's team at the 2009 European Cross Country Championships.

He claimed the short course title at the 2010 World Military Cross Country Championships in March. He ran in the 10,000 m at the 2010 European Athletics Championships and was seventh in the final, while fellow Italian  Daniele Meucci reached the podium. He had a career best finish of sixth in the senior race at the 2010 European Cross Country Championships, although the Italian team was fourth at the event.

He made his debut over the half marathon at the Stramilano in March 2011 and managed to finish the course in a time of 62:32 minutes, being the first non-African finisher. This was the first time he had run the distance as, even in training, he had not exceeded 20 km. Lalli missed the rest of the 2011 season as he underwent Achilles surgery. On his return, he was the runner-up at the 2012 European Clubs Cross Country, finishing behind Ayad Lamdassem but helping his club (Fiamme Gialle) to third in the competition. At the Stramilano he came a close second to Yacob Jarso in a time of 1:01:11 hours – a personal best and the best performance by an Italian man at the event since 2002.

He won the 2012 European Cross Country Championships title convincingly with a time of 30:01, 10 seconds ahead of the runner-up Hassan Chahdi from France.

Achievements

National titles
He won 5 times the national championship at senior level.
 Italian Athletics Championships
 Half marathon: 2015
 10 km road: 2014
 Cross country running: 2008, 2009, 2015

References

External links
 

1987 births
Living people
Italian male cross country runners
Italian male long-distance runners
Sportspeople from Florence
Athletics competitors of Fiamme Gialle
Italian male marathon runners
European Cross Country Championships winners
20th-century Italian people
21st-century Italian people